Gilbert Lawrence Geis (January 10, 1925 – November 10, 2012) was an American criminologist known for his research on white-collar crime. He is particularly recognized for his paper "The Heavy Electric Equipment Antitrust Case of 1961", originally published in the 1967 book Criminal Behavior Systems: A Typology.

He played a major role in founding the Department of Criminology, Law and Society in the School of Social Ecology at the University of California, Irvine. He also served as president of the Association of Certified Fraud Examiners and the American Society of Criminology. He was a member of the President's Commission on Law Enforcement and Administration of Justice convened by then-President of the United States Lyndon B. Johnson. He was author of over 500 articles and book chapters, as well as twenty-eight books. He was described by Henry Pontell and Paul Jesilow as "one of the most prolific scholars in all of social science".

References

External links

Faculty profile

1925 births
2012 deaths
American criminologists
Presidents of the American Society of Criminology
University of California, Irvine faculty
Colgate University alumni
Brigham Young University alumni
University of Wisconsin–Madison alumni
Scientists from New York City